This is a list of members of the Victorian Legislative Council between 1946 and 1949. As half of the Legislative Council's terms expired at each triennial election, half of these members were elected at the 1943 triennial election with terms expiring in 1949, while the other half were elected at the 1946 triennial election with terms expiring in 1952.

 In August 1946, Leonard Rodda, Country MLC for Western, resigned. Independent Liberal candidate Hugh MacLeod won the resulting by-election on 30 November 1946.
 On 28 December 1947, Daniel McNamara, Labor MLC for Melbourne Province, died. Labor candidate Fred Thomas won the resulting by-election on 20 March 1948.
 On 6 June 1948, William Edgar, Liberal MLC for East Yarra Province, died. Liberal candidate Ewen Paul Cameron won the resulting by-election on 7 August 1948.
 On 30 April 1949, Sir George Goudie, Country MLC for North Western Province, died. No by-election was held due to the proximity of the 1949 triennial election.

Sources
 Re-member (a database of all Victorian MPs since 1851). Parliament of Victoria.
 Victorian Year Book 1943–44

Members of the Parliament of Victoria by term
20th-century Australian politicians